Maurice Wellock (15 June 1902 – 1967) was an English professional footballer who scored 111 goals from 278 appearances in the Football League.

Life and career
Wellock was born in Bradford, Yorkshire, where he attended Drummond Road School. In 1916, he became the first Bradford boy to be capped for England in a schoolboy international. He began his senior career with hometown club Bradford City. He played for their first team in the wartime leagues at the age of fifteen, but never appeared once the Football League resumed after the war.

He had joined Halifax Town by 1919, and made his league debut in the 1921–22 season. He scored three times in 33 games for Halifax before moving to Blackpool in 1923. He was not a regular in the Blackpool side, playing 27 league games in which he scored seven times, and moved to Oldham Athletic in February 1927, scoring six goals in just five league games, including four on his debut in a 5–2 win away to Grimsby Town.

In June 1927, he joined newly promoted Torquay United, playing in Torquay's first ever game in the Football League, a 1–1 draw at home to local rivals Exeter City on 27 August 1927. He spent just one season with Torquay, scoring three times in 27 games before joining Southern League club Peterborough & Fletton United.

In 1929, he returned to the Football League with Darlington where he played regularly as a centre-forward, having played mainly as a defender with Torquay. He scored 71 goals, including five in one game against Rotherham United in 1930, in 104 league games for Darlington, finishing his career with a further 21 goals in 82 league games for Halifax Town.

References

1902 births
1967 deaths
Footballers from Bradford
English footballers
Association football forwards
Association football wing halves
Bradford City A.F.C. players
Halifax Town A.F.C. players
Blackpool F.C. players
Oldham Athletic A.F.C. players
Torquay United F.C. players
Peterborough & Fletton United F.C. players
Darlington F.C. players
English Football League players
Southern Football League players